Tropical Storm Yagi, also known as Tropical Storm Karding in the Philippines, was a damaging tropical storm that impacted Philippines from enhanced southwest monsoon and China.

Meteorological history 

A tropical disturbance had persisted towards the southwest of Iwo To on August 1. After the course of five days, the system finally strengthened into a tropical depression by the JMA, with the JTWC following suit several hours later (designating it as 18W). The PAGASA also began issuing bulletins to the system, locally assigning the name Karding. Karding maintained its intensity as a tropical depression due to moderate to strong easterly shear, despite persistent convection surrounding the system. By August 8, a METOP-A ASCAT image showed that the system had winds of 35 knots, hence the JTWC upgrading it to a tropical storm. The JMA around the same time did the same, naming it Yagi. Within the next day, Yagi curved towards the northwest while continuously battling shear as it struggled to intensify. Though by 12:00 UTC of August 11, the JMA considered that Yagi reached its peak strength with 10-minute winds of 75 km/h (45 mph) and a minimum pressure of 990 hPa.

The JTWC declared that Yagi reached winds of 85 km/h (50 mph) on 12:00 UTC of August 12 after the storm had consolidated further with an improved structure. Yagi made landfall shortly thereafter over Wenling, in Taizhou of Zhejiang, China, at around 23:35 CST (15:35 UTC) on August 12. By 21:00 UTC of that day, the JTWC issued their final advisory on Yagi, but continued to track it until it weakened further into a tropical depression early on August 13. The JMA did the same on 06:00 UTC of August 13, but continued to tracked it until it became an extratropical system on August 15.

Impact 
Although Yagi (Karding) didn't make landfall in the Philippines, the storm enhanced the southwest monsoon which brought extreme flooding towards many regions within the country. According to the NDRRMC, 5 people died along with ₱996 million (US$19 million) worth of damages. In East China, Yagi killed a total of 3 people and total damages were counted to be CN¥2.51 billion (US$367 million).

References

External links 

JMA Best Track for 2018 Pacific typhoon season

Tropical storms
Yagi